Washington Township is the name of forty-nine townships in Iowa:

 Washington Township, Adair County, Iowa
 Washington Township, Adams County, Iowa
 Washington Township, Appanoose County, Iowa
 Washington Township, Black Hawk County, Iowa
 Washington Township, Bremer County, Iowa
 Washington Township, Buchanan County, Iowa
 Washington Township, Buena Vista County, Iowa
 Washington Township, Butler County, Iowa
 Washington Township, Carroll County, Iowa
 Washington Township, Cass County, Iowa
 Washington Township, Chickasaw County, Iowa
 Washington Township, Clarke County, Iowa
 Washington Township, Clinton County, Iowa
 Washington Township, Crawford County, Iowa
 Washington Township, Dallas County, Iowa
 Washington Township, Des Moines County, Iowa
 Washington Township, Dubuque County, Iowa
 Washington Township, Fremont County, Iowa
 Washington Township, Greene County, Iowa
 Washington Township, Grundy County, Iowa
 Washington Township, Harrison County, Iowa
 Washington Township, Iowa County, Iowa
 Washington Township, Jackson County, Iowa
 Washington Township, Jasper County, Iowa
 Washington Township, Johnson County, Iowa
 Washington Township, Jones County, Iowa
 Washington Township, Keokuk County, Iowa
 Washington Township, Lee County, Iowa
 Washington Township, Linn County, Iowa
 Washington Township, Lucas County, Iowa
 Washington Township, Marion County, Iowa
 Washington Township, Marshall County, Iowa
 Washington Township, Montgomery County, Iowa
 Washington Township, Page County, Iowa
 Washington Township, Plymouth County, Iowa
 Washington Township, Polk County, Iowa
 Washington Township, Pottawattamie County, Iowa
 Washington Township, Poweshiek County, Iowa
 Washington Township, Ringgold County, Iowa
 Washington Township, Shelby County, Iowa
 Washington Township, Sioux County, Iowa
 Washington Township, Story County, Iowa
 Washington Township, Taylor County, Iowa
 Washington Township, Van Buren County, Iowa
 Washington Township, Wapello County, Iowa
 Washington Township, Washington County, Iowa
 Washington Township, Wayne County, Iowa
 Washington Township, Webster County, Iowa
 Washington Township, Winneshiek County, Iowa

See also

Washington Township (disambiguation)

Iowa township disambiguation pages